The World Tonight is a British current affairs radio programme broadcast on BBC Radio 4, every weekday evening, which started out as an extension of the 10 pm news. It is produced by BBC News and features news, analysis and comment on domestic and world issues. Ritula Shah was until February 27, 2023 the main presenter, usually presenting the first three days of the week. The programme utilises other BBC broadcasters including David Eades, Carolyn Quinn, James Coomarasamy, Roger Hearing, Samira Ahmed and Felicity Evans to regularly present on Thursdays, Fridays and in Shah's absence. Between 1989 and 2012, the main presenter was Robin Lustig.

History
The World Tonight was first broadcast on 6 April 1970, starting on the same day as the PM Programme. It was introduced following the changes at Broadcasting House which ushered in Radio 1, to create "the serious current affairs programme of the day" on the new Radio 4, as one survivor recalls.

Broadcast live at 10 pm, initially for only thirty minutes, its tone was set by presenter Douglas Stuart, a former Washington and Bonn correspondent for the BBC. The first edition contained interviews on Northern Ireland and relations between West Germany and the United States. Later that week, ideas for better government in Scotland and peace in the Middle East were featured.

Its focus on international news was set early on by events in Washington surrounding Watergate. The US time zone (five hours behind the UK) meant that the programme could bring up to the minute developments at 10 pm. Its first reporters came from within the ranks of the programme's own producers, which meant that packages or features were cut from a different cloth than standard news reports. Today's World Tonight reporters may not have come from the same stable but the emphasis on perceptive, contextual reporting has remained.

Presenters with strong journalistic credentials, including John Tusa, Anthony Howard, Richard Kershaw, Isabel Hilton and Robin Lustig, have secured and maintained the programme's reputation for authoritative coverage.

Other notable former staffers include Dominic Lawson, former editor of The Sunday Telegraph, Jim Gray, former editor of Channel 4 News, Jonathan Freedland of The Guardian, and Henry Kelly.

Veterans recall the traditionally 'relaxed' figure of the editor. The laissez faire approach of the boss over the years created a culture in which Output Editors, responsible for daily editions, were able to take risks, some of which have led to notable scoops, such as the predicted arrest on war crimes charges of General Augusto Pinochet in 1998.

A staple of the Radio 4 schedule for over four decades, 2013 figures showed The World Tonight has retained 1.75 million listeners, representing 17.8% of the national radio audience at 10 pm.

In popular culture
 In the 1968 science fiction film 2001: A Space Odyssey, The World Tonight is depicted as a television news programme on channel "BBC-12".  During the programme, a reporter named Martin Amer (played by actor Mike Lovell) interviews the crew of Discovery-1 on a voyage to Jupiter.  The overall host of the show, who leads into the interview segment, is played by Kenneth Kendall.
 In the first ever episode of BBC comedy programme The Thick of It, Secretary of State for Social Affairs, Hugh Abbott (played by actor Chris Langham), speaks live to presenter Robin Lustig on The World Tonight late after office hours, in order to try and rectify a blunder that has played out across the day regarding the multiple U-turns on whether or not they are announcing the department's new 'Anti-Benefit Fraud Executive' (colloquially named 'Snooper Force'). Abbott, however, worsens the situation by panicking and calling it the 'Sponge Avengers', and then having the interview drowned out by a nearby cleaner who is hoovering.

Presenters

Current
Since 2012 the programme has used a roster of broadcasters to host, with one regular presenter as main presenter.

Past
Ritula Shah - regular presenter from 2009 - February 27 2023; main presenter from 2012
Jane Hill – occasional presenter
 Jackie Hardgrave
 Claire Bolderson – regular presenter: 1999–2009
 Julian Worricker – occasional presenter
 Isabel Hilton – main presenter: 1995–1998
 Harriet Cass
 David Sells
 Richard Kershaw
 Robin Lustig – main presenter: 1989–2012
 Alexander Macleod
 Anthony Howard
 John Morgan
 John Tusa
 Douglas Stuart
 Justin Webb – 1997–1998

Editors
 Roger Sawyer
 Alistair Burnett 
 David Stevenson (Acting Editor for 2 years)
 Prue Keely
 Prue Keely & Jenni Russell (Joint Editors)
 Ann Koch
 Margaret Budy
 Blair Thompson
 Ken Goudie
 Jonathan Fenton-Fischer

Reporters

Current
 Beth McLeod
 Paul Moss

Past
 Jonty Bloom, The World Tonight's economics and Europe correspondent.
 Janet Cohen, Reporter World Tonight 1979-1981 & 1983-2006
 Sally Hardcastle
 John Schofield
 Rachel Johnson
 Henry Kelly
 John Egan

Awards

 In 2011, The World Tonight was nominated for a Sony award for Best News & Current Affairs Programme.
 In 2009, Jonty Bloom won the Royal Statistical Society award for Statistical Excellence in Journalism.
 In 2006, Paul Moss won the Foreign Press Association's award for Environment Story of the Year for his reports on the environmental impact of India's economic growth
 In 2006 & 2004 Jonty Bloom's reporting on business and economics won the World Tonight the Wincott Foundation award, for radio programme of the year.
 In 1998, Robin Lustig won a Sony Silver award as Talk/News Broadcaster of the Year.
 In 1995, Janet Cohen won a Sony Bronze Award as Radio Reporter of the Year for work covering the 1994 US Midterm Elections, the Refugee Crisis in former Yugoslavia and the Anniversary of the D-Day landings in 1944.
 In 1994, Janet Cohen won a New York Festivals Finalist Award for her programme, Seeing Red With The Boys in Blue, on sexual discrimination in the Police Service. 
 In 1992, Robin Lustig was awarded a Gold Medal at the New York Radio Festival for a special edition of The World Tonight broadcast live from Moscow on the last day of the Soviet Union
 In 1990, Janet Cohen was nominated for a BP Arts Journalism Award for work on the ethics of restoring antique monuments.

See also
 Today, Radio 4's early morning stablemate to the World Tonight programme.
 The World At One, Radio 4's lunchtime stablemate to the World Tonight Programme.
 PM, Radio 4's early evening stablemate to the World Tonight programme.

Footnotes

External links

Alistair Burnett's Editors Blog
The Secret of Radio 4's Success, The Telegraph
Television for Grown-ups, The Guardian
Robin Lustig: My Life in the Media, The Independent

BBC Radio 4 programmes
1970 radio programme debuts
BBC news radio programmes